In enzymology, a polyamine-transporting ATPase is an enzyme that catalyzes the chemical reaction

ATP + H2O + polyamineout  ADP + phosphate + polyaminein

The 3 substrates of this enzyme are ATP, H2O, and polyamine, whereas its 3 products are ADP, phosphate, and polyamine.

This enzyme belongs to the family of hydrolases, specifically those acting on acid anhydrides to catalyse transmembrane movement of substances. The systematic name of this enzyme class is ATP phosphohydrolase (polyamine-importing). This enzyme participates in abc transporters - general.

References

 
 
 

EC 3.6.3
Enzymes of unknown structure